WLRT (1250 kHz) is a commercial AM radio station licensed to Nicholasville, Kentucky and serving the Lexington–Fayette metropolitan area.  It is owned by New Albany Broadcasting and airs a Regional Mexican music format, called "Poder" or Power.  Programming is simulcast on WLRS in New Albany, Indiana (Louisville radio market).

History
In December 1961, WLRT first signed on as WNVL.  It was originally a daytimer, required to be off the air at night, so it would not interfere with other stations on AM 1250.  But in the 1990s, it got permission to broadcast at low power after sunset.

References

External links
 

LRT
Nicholasville, Kentucky
1961 establishments in Kentucky
Radio stations established in 1961